The 2006 CONCACAF Women's Gold Cup was the seventh edition of the CONCACAF Women's Gold Cup, and also acted as a qualifier tournament for the 2007 FIFA Women's World Cup. The final tournament took place in the United States between 19 and 27 November 2006.  The United States and Canada received byes into the semi-finals of the tournament after contesting the final of the 2002 Gold Cup, while four other spots were determined through regional qualification.

The United States won the competition with Canada the runner-up. Both teams automatically qualified for the 2007 Women's World Cup, while third place Mexico lost to AFC fourth-place finisher Japan in a play-off for a spot.

Teams

Qualification

UNCAF/NAFU Qualifying

The group winners qualified for the Gold Cup finals.

Group A

Group B

CFU Qualifying

Also known as the Women's Caribbean Cup, there were two spots available for the 22 teams taking part.

Preliminary round

|-
|}

  Bahamas, Guyana and Montserrat withdrew.

Antigua and Barbuda won 1–0 on aggregate.

Netherlands Antilles won 3–1 on aggregate.

US Virgin Islands won 8–1 on aggregate.

First round

The group winners, in bold, qualified for the final round. Haiti were unable to participate in group B, as they were denied entry to the hosting country Aruba, and thus a play-off between the winners of group B, Suriname, and Haiti was arranged. Haiti won the play-off, but Suriname qualified as best runners-up owing to goal difference, along with Bermuda.

Group A

Group B

Playoff

Group C

Group D

Final round

Trinidad & Tobago hosted the final round, consisting of two groups of three teams, between 6 September and 10 September. The winner of each group, in bold, have qualified for the Gold Cup finals.

Group A

Group B

Final tournament

First round

Semifinals
Winners qualified for 2007 FIFA Women's World Cup.

Third place play-off
Winner advanced to AFC–CONCACAF play-off.

Final

Awards

References

External links
 Regulations

Women's Gold Cup, 2006
CONCACAF Women's Championship tournaments
International women's association football competitions hosted by the United States
CON
2006 in American women's soccer
CONCACAF Women's Gold Cup
CONCACAF Women's Gold Cup
CON
CONCACAF Women's Gold Cup